Giovanni Galloni (16 June 1927 – 23 April 2018) was an Italian politician, former Minister of Education and former vice president of the High Council of the Judiciary.

Biography 
Born in Paternò, Sicily, Galloni graduated in law from the University of Bologna and taught Agricultural Law at the University of Naples Federico II, the University of Florence and the University of Rome Tor Vergata.

A member of the left-wing Christian Democracy Party, Galloni was elected to the Chamber of Deputies from 1968 to 1987 and was appointed Minister of Education in the Goria Cabinet and the following De Mita Cabinet.

In July 1990, Galloni left his seat at parliament after he was elected vice president of the CSM (High Council of the Judiciary, Italy) where he remained in office until 1994. During Galloni's term as vice president of the CSM, President Francesco Cossiga implemented several restrictions on the jurisdiction of the office of vice president. These restrictions were subsequently removed by his successor, President Oscar Luigi Scalfaro.

Galloni died in Rome on 23 April 2018, at the age of 90.

References

External links 
Files about his parliamentary activities (in Italian): V, VI, VII, VIII, IX, X legislature

1927 births
2018 deaths
People from Paternò
Christian Democracy (Italy) politicians
20th-century Italian politicians
21st-century Italian politicians
Education ministers of Italy
University of Bologna alumni
Academic staff of the University of Florence
Politicians from the Province of Catania